The Simon and Garfunkel Collection: 17 of Their All-Time Greatest Recordings is the second compilation album of greatest hits by Simon & Garfunkel, first issued in November 1981, 2 months after performing at the landmark The Concert in Central Park.

Unlike the first compilation album Simon and Garfunkel's Greatest Hits from 1972, it contained no new or live material. Instead it featured recordings by the duo originally released between 1964 and 1972 from all 5 studio albums and every studio single, excepting The Dangling Conversation and Fakin' It, whilst adding the non-single title track from their first album Wednesday Morning, 3 A.M., as well as "Song for the Asking", the last track on their final album, Bridge Over Troubled Water.

Two full songs from the Bookends album are included as one track: "Old Friends" segues into the “Bookends Theme (Reprise)”, as it does on Bookends and the B-side of the “Mrs. Robinson” single. This is in contrast to the "clean" version of "Bookends" (without the segued string from "Old Friends") which was featured on Simon and Garfunkel's Greatest Hits. This makes the title of the album slightly erroneous, since there are effectively a total of 18 songs included.

Track listing
All songs written by Paul Simon, except where noted
"I Am a Rock"
"Homeward Bound"
"America"
"The 59th Street Bridge Song (Feelin' Groovy)"
"Wednesday Morning, 3 A.M."
"El Condor Pasa (If I Could)" (Daniel Alomía Robles, English lyrics by Simon, arranged by Jorge Milchberg)
"At the Zoo" 
"Scarborough Fair/Canticle" (traditional, arr. Simon & Art Garfunkel with Canticle by Simon)
"The Boxer"
"The Sound of Silence"
"Mrs. Robinson"
"Keep the Customer Satisfied"
"Song for the Asking"
"A Hazy Shade of Winter"
"Cecilia"
"Old Friends/Bookends Theme (Reprise)"
"Bridge over Troubled Water"

Personnel
Paul Simon - Guitar, Vocals
Art Garfunkel - Vocals

Charts

Weekly charts

Year-end charts

Certifications and sales

References

1981 greatest hits albums
Simon & Garfunkel compilation albums
Albums produced by Tom Wilson (record producer)
Albums produced by Bob Johnston
Albums produced by Roy Halee
Albums produced by Paul Simon
Albums produced by Art Garfunkel